Jennifer Lee Carrell is an American author of three novels and numerous articles for Smithsonian Magazine and Arizona Daily Star.

Background
Born in Washington, D.C., Carrell spent a brief stint of her childhood in Long Beach, CA before moving with her family to her father's hometown, Tucson, Arizona. She graduated with undergraduate degrees from Stanford (1984) and Oxford (1988), and earned a PhD in English Literature from Harvard in 1994.

Career
Beginning her career in academia, Carrell served as a lecturer in the "Hist & Lit" (History and Literature) Departments at Harvard from 1994 to 1997 and taught Expository Writing from 1997 to 1998. After getting her first freelance assignment from Smithsonian Magazine -- "How the Bard Won the West" — which explored Shakespeare's surprising popularity among cowboys, miners, and mountain men of the Old West, Carrell left university life in order to further pursue her writing.

A passionate believer in the arts, she worked as the classical music, opera, and dance critic for the Arizona Daily Star (Tucson) from 1999 to 2001. She has directed Shakespeare plays for Harvard's Hyperion Theatre Company and served as a dramaturg for the Arizona Theatre Company.

Personal life
Carrell resides in Tucson, Arizona with her husband and daughter.

Novels
 Barnes & Noble "Discover Great New Writers" book

Republished as  Sunday Times of London Top Ten; New York Times Bestseller List; Finalist, Best First Novel, International Thriller Writers (2008)
 Published in the UK as The Shakespeare Curse.  Sunday Times (London) Top Ten; Indie notables, IndieBound (May 2010)

References

Sources

External links

1962 births
Living people
21st-century American novelists
21st-century American women writers
Harvard Graduate School of Arts and Sciences alumni
Writers from Long Beach, California
Writers from Tucson, Arizona
Stanford University alumni
Writers from Washington, D.C.
American women journalists
American women novelists
Novelists from Arizona
21st-century American non-fiction writers